Bank of America, N. A. v. Caulkett, 575 U.S. 790, 135 S. Ct. 1995 (2015), is a bankruptcy law case decided by the Supreme Court of the United States on June 1, 2015. In Caulkett, the Court held that 11 U.S.C. § 506(d) does not permit a Chapter 7 debtor to void a junior mortgage on the debtor's property when the amount of the debt secured by the senior mortgage on that property exceeds the property's current market value.

Background

"Allowed Secured Claims" in Bankruptcy

Statutory Provisions
Section 506(d) of the Bankruptcy Code provides, as a general rule, "[t]o the extent that a lien secures a claim against the debtor that is not an allowed secured claim, such lien is void." As used in the Bankruptcy Code, the term "claim" includes any "right to payment," and the term "lien" means a "charge against or interest in property to secure payment of a debt or performance of an obligation." A claim is "allowed" if proof of the claim is filed under 11 U.S.C. § 501, and the claim is not objected to by a party in interest.

As to what constitutes a "secured" claim, § 506(a) provides the following: Where a creditor's allowed claim is "secured by a lien on property in which the [bankruptcy] estate has an interest," that allowed claim "is a secured claim to the extent of the value of such creditor's interest in the estate's interest in such property ... and is an unsecured claim to the extent that the value of such creditor's interest ... is less than the amount of such allowed claim." In § 506(a), a creditor-lienor's "interest" in the estate's interest in certain collateral property means that creditor's lien on that property. As a functional matter, the value of a creditor-lienor's lien generally depends on four factors:
 the "purpose of the valuation and ... the proposed disposition or use of [the collateral] property."
 the value of the collateral property (and the estate's interest therein)
 the amount of the creditor-lienor's allowed claim
 the priority of the creditor-lienor's lien in relation to other interests in the collateral property.
Section 506(a) thus distinguishes between "secured claims" and "unsecured" claims based on the numeric relation between (A) the value of a creditor-lienor's interest in the estate's interest in the collateral property; and (B) the amount of that creditor-lienor's allowed claim.  In common bankruptcy parlance, this same numeric relation is used to denominate a creditor-lienor's allowed claim as "oversecured," "fully secured," or "undersecured." In a given case, the particular denomination used depends on the particular nature of that numeric relation.

Oversecured Claim
A creditor-lienor's allowed claim is "oversecured" to the extent that the value of that creditor's interest in the estate's interest in the collateral property exceeds the amount of that creditor's allowed claim.
Fully Secured Claim
A creditor-lienor's allowed claim is "fully secured" where the value of that creditor's interest in the estate's interest in the collateral property equals the amount of that creditor's allowed claim.
Undersecured Claim
A creditor-lienor's allowed claim is "undersecured" to the extent that the value of that creditor's interest in the estate's interest in the collateral property is less than the amount of that creditor's allowed claim, but greater than zero.

Dewsnup v. Timm
Dewsnup v. Timm, 502 U.S. 410 (1992), presented the Supreme Court with its first occasion to interpret 11 U.S.C. § 506(d). Specifically, Dewsnup presented the question whether § 506(d) allows a Chapter 7 debtor to avoid an undersecured creditor's lien on the debtor's realty to the extent that the amount of the claim secured by that lien exceeds the collateral realty's fair market value. In Dewsnup, the Chapter 7 debtor's $120,000 debt to a creditor was secured by lien on certain of the debtor's realty, the fair market value of which was $39,000. The debtor, invoking § 506(d), sought to void that lien to the extent that the creditor-lienor's $120,000 claim exceeded the collateral realty's $39,000 fair market value, thereby "stripping down" the creditor's lien to the value of the collateral realty.

The Dewsnup Court held that § 506(d) does not permit a Chapter 7 debtor to "strip down" an undersecured creditor's lien on the debtor's realty to the fair market value of the collateral realty. The Court concluded that the phrase "allowed secured claim" in § 506(d) meant an "allowed claim" of a creditor secured by a lien; that is, the phrase "allowed secured claim" did not have the same meaning in § 506(d) as in § 506(a)(1). In so concluding, the Court acknowledged the apparent logical infirmity in its construction of § 506(d), but observed that it was not "writing on a clean slate." As support for that proposition, the Court cited "the pre-Code rule that liens pass through bankruptcy unaffected." Because the Court found "ambiguity" in the text of § 506(d), the Court was "not convinced that Congress intended to depart from" that rule. Thus, the Court's conclusion: the phrase "allowed secured claim" in § 506(d) means an "allowed claim" of a creditor secured by a lien.

The Court's decision in Dewsnup was poorly received and has been subject to extensive criticism "from its inception." For example, Justice Scalia's dissent in Dewsnup castigated the majority for "disregarding well-established and oft-repeated principles of statutory construction" and engaging in "'one-subsection-at-a-time' interpretation." And in Bank of America National Trust and Savings Association v. 203 North LaSalle Street Partnership, 526 U.S. 434 (1999),  Justice Thomas criticized Dewsnup for "enshroud[ing] both the Courts of Appeals ... and Bankruptcy Courts" in "methodological confusion." However, "[r]ight or wrong, the Dewsnuppian departure from the statute's plain language is the law."

Caulkett: Facts; Proceedings Below; Question Presented

Facts
The debtor, David B. Caulkett, had two mortgage liens on his house in Melbourne, Florida; Bank of America held the junior mortgage lien. In 2013, Caulkett filed a bankruptcy petition under Chapter 7 in the U.S. Bankruptcy Court for the Middle District of Florida; at that time, the amount of the senior mortgage debt was greater than the fair market value of Caulkett's house.

Proceedings Below
After filing in Chapter 7, Caulkett moved to void Bank of America's junior mortgage lien under § 506(d). The Bankruptcy Court granted Caulkett's motion, and Bank of America appealed. Both the District Court and the Eleventh Circuit affirmed the Bankruptcy Court's order. Thereafter, Bank of America filed a petition for a writ of certiorari in the Supreme Court, which the Court granted on November 17, 2014.

Question Presented
Caulkett presented the question whether a Chapter 7 debtor may void a junior mortgage on the debtor's property under § 506(d) when the amount of the debt secured by the senior mortgage on that property exceeds the property's current value.

Opinion of the Court
In Caulkett, the Court unanimously held that § 506(d) does not allow a Chapter 7 debtor to void a junior mortgage on the debtor's property when the amount of the debt secured by the senior mortgage on that property exceeds the property's current market value. The Court-based this holding on its prior decision in Dewsnup, reasoning as follows: 
Dewsnup held that the phrase "allowed secured claim" in § 506(d) means an "allowed claim" of a creditor secured by a lien on property.
Bank of America's claim against Caulkett was "allowed" under § 502.
Bank of America's allowed claim was secured by a lien on property; Bank of America held the junior mortgage on Caulkett's house.
Thus, Bank of America's junior mortgage lien on Caulkett's house could not be voided under § 506(d).
Although the Court expressly acknowledged the logical infirmity in Dewsnup reasoning, it declined to overrule Dewsnup; noting that Caulkett had not asked the Court to do so. Having declined to overrule Dewsnup, the Court concluded that Dewsnup dictated only one result: Section 506(d) does not allow a Chapter 7 debtor to void a junior mortgage on the debtor's property when the amount of the debt secured by the senior mortgage on that property exceeds the property's current market value.

Commentary and analysis
Commentators on the Caulkett decision have at turns expressed bewilderment that the Caulkett Court declined to overrule Dewsnup and wariness as to heralding the long-term reign of Dewsnup and Caulkett. For example, one commentator has described it as "strange" that the Caulkett Court "went out of [its] way to criticize Dewsnup", yet declined to take the further step of overruling it. And another has remarked, more generally, that "Caulkett has kept spectators baffled as to why it did not overrule Dewsnup". At the same time, in light of the Caulkett Court's criticism of Dewsnup, other commentators have also questioned the long-term stability of Dewsnup reign and thus—by extension—the future of Caulkett itself. Yet for the time being, Dewsnup and Caulkett are the law.

Notes and references
All citations herein are written in Bluebook style.

Notes

References

External links
 

United States Supreme Court cases
2015 in United States case law
United States Supreme Court cases of the Roberts Court
United States bankruptcy case law
Bank of America
Melbourne, Florida
Mortgage industry of the United States